Jujubinus unidentatus is a species of sea snail, a marine gastropod mollusk in the family Trochidae, the top snails.

Description
The size of the shell varies between 6 mm and 13 mm.

Distribution
This species occurs in the Mediterranean Sea off Tunisia.

References

 Philippi R. A., 1844: Enumeratio molluscorum Siciliae cum viventium tum in tellure tertiaria fossilium, quae in itinere suo observavit. Vol. 2; Eduard Anton, Halle [Halis Saxorum] iv + 303 p., pl. 13–28 
 Monterosato T. A. (di), 1884: Nomenclatura generica e specifica di alcune conchiglie mediterranee; Palermo, Virzi pp. 152
 Pallary P., 1906: Liste des Mollusques marins de la baie de Tripoli; Annales de la Société Linnéenne de Lyon 53: 203–213
 Nordsieck F., 1973: Il genere Jujubinus Monterosato, 1884 in Europa; La Conchiglia 50: 6–7, 11–12
 Gofas, S.; Le Renard, J.; Bouchet, P. (2001). Mollusca, in: Costello, M.J. et al. (Ed.) (2001). European register of marine species: a check-list of the marine species in Europe and a bibliography of guides to their identification. Collection Patrimoines Naturels, 50: pp. 180–213

External links
 Gastropods.com: Jujubinus unidentatus

unidentatus
Gastropods described in 1844